The 2019 World Series was the championship series of Major League Baseball's (MLB) 2019 season. The 115th edition of the World Series, it was a best-of-seven playoff between the American League champion Houston Astros and the National League champion Washington Nationals. The series was played from October 22 to October 30. The Nationals won the series, four games to three, to secure their first title in franchise history and first in the capital city since the 1924 series. Washington pitcher Stephen Strasburg was named the World Series Most Valuable Player (MVP) after earning two wins in the series.

The Astros had home-field advantage for the series, due to having a better regular-season record than the Nationals. It was the third World Series in which home-field advantage was decided by the regular-season records of the American and National league champions, a practice that started in the 2017 season. It was the first World Series in which the Houston Astros had home-field advantage. The series was played in a 2–3–2 format, with the Astros hosting Games 1, 2, 6, and 7; and the Nationals hosting Games 3, 4, and 5.

For the first time in any of the major North American sports leagues, the visiting team won all the games of a seven-game championship series, surpassing the previous high of five. The road team outscored the home team 49-14 in the seven games played. Washington won despite scoring only three runs at home. It was the sixth straight World Series in which the championship was clinched by the visiting team.

With the Nationals being from the National League East, this marked the sixth World Series in a row to have been won by teams from separate divisions in Major League Baseball.

For the third straight year, MLB sold presenting sponsorships to all of postseason series. As with the 2017 and 2018 World Series, this World Series was sponsored by YouTube TV and was officially known as the 2019 World Series presented by YouTube TV.

Background

This was the first World Series appearance for the franchise that began its existence as the Montreal Expos in 1969, and moved to Washington, D.C. in 2005 to become the Nationals. The Nationals were also the last team from the 1969 expansion class (which also included the Kansas City Royals, Milwaukee Brewers—who began as the Seattle Pilots—and San Diego Padres) to earn a trip to the series. Their World Series appearance also means that all National League (NL) teams have played in at least one World Series. The only American League (AL) team that has yet to play in a World Series is the Seattle Mariners, who were part of the 1977 expansion. Prior to this series, the Astros and Nationals had never played each other in a postseason series, despite Houston playing in the NL from 1962 to 2012 until their move to the AL West in 2013. In fact, the Nationals are the only team the Astros have faced in the World Series  that they have never faced in a pre-World Series playoff round, since the Astros have faced the White Sox, Dodgers, and Braves during at least one playoff round prior to the World Series. The Astros and Nationals did not play an interleague game in 2019, and last faced each other during the 2017 regular season. The two teams share a spring training site in West Palm Beach, Florida, and opened the 2019 spring training schedule against each other. The Astros were deemed as heavy favorites to win the title.

Washington Nationals

The Nationals finished the 2018 season with an 82–80 win–loss record, and started the 2019 season with a 19–31 record.  Second-year manager Dave Martinez began to receive public pressure to be fired by the Nationals. The team engineered a turnaround and finished the season in second place in the National League East, four games behind the Atlanta Braves, ending the year with a 93–69 record. The Nationals were one of two teams to qualify for the playoffs as a wild card team from the National League. Martinez had missed three games in September due to a cardiac catheterization procedure to treat angina.

The fourth-seeded Nationals defeated the Milwaukee Brewers at home in the National League Wild Card Game, coming behind from a 3–1 deficit in the eighth inning to win 4–3. The Nationals then upset the top-seeded Los Angeles Dodgers, who had won the previous two National League pennants, in the National League Division Series. The Nationals were behind two games to one, and won their second and third elimination games of the postseason to take the best-of-five series. The postseason series win was the first in Washington Nationals history. In the best-of-seven National League Championship Series, the Nationals swept the St. Louis Cardinals (who had defeated the Braves in the Division Series round) in four games to secure the first pennant in franchise history (including their time as the Montreal Expos from 1969 to 2004). It was the first World Series appearance for a team from Washington D.C. since , including 33 seasons that the city did not host an MLB team (1972–2004).

Houston Astros

In the prior two seasons, the Astros had won the 2017 World Series, the franchise's first World Series championship, and lost the 2018 American League Championship Series to the Boston Red Sox. The Astros finished the 2019 regular season atop the American League West—their third consecutive division championship—with a 107–55 win–loss record. Their 107 wins were a franchise record, and the most in MLB for the season.

The Astros entered the postseason as the overall #1 seed. Their first opponent in the postseason was determined by the American League Wild Card Game, which saw the Tampa Bay Rays defeat the Oakland Athletics. In the best-of-five American League Division Series, the top-seeded Astros defeated fifth-seeded Tampa Bay in five games, with each game of the series being won by the home team. The Astros' opponent in the best-of-seven American League Championship Series (ALCS) was the second-seeded New York Yankees, who had defeated the Minnesota Twins in their playoff series, three games to none. In the ALCS, the Astros and Yankee split the first two games, followed by the Astros winning two-of-three games played at Yankee Stadium. Game 6 in Houston was then won by the Astros, giving them the series win, four games to two. The Astros' ALCS victory advanced them to their third overall World Series appearance (2 in the American League & one in the National League), and second in three years.

Summary

Game summaries
The below game summaries include a line score of each game, showing the runs scored by each team during each inning. Various baseball terms appearing in the summaries can be found in the glossary of baseball. The performance of pitchers in a game is often summarized by wording such as "two runs on three hits while striking out four batters", indicating how many runs and hits the pitcher allowed (the fewer, the better) and how many opposing batters the pitcher struck out (the more, the better).

Game 1

Before the national anthem sung by Nicole Scherzinger, a moment of silence took place in honor of umpire Eric Cooper, who had died on October 20. Former Astro Brian McCann threw out the ceremonial first pitch to former teammate Evan Gattis. Max Scherzer started for the Nationals, while Gerrit Cole started for the Astros. With two outs in the bottom of the first inning, Yuli Gurriel hit a two-run double, giving the Astros a 2–0 lead. In the top of the second inning, Ryan Zimmerman hit a home run to cut the Astros' lead to 2–1. Juan Soto led off the top of the fourth inning with a home run to tie the game, 2–2. Soto became the fourth-youngest player to hit a home run in a World Series; Andruw Jones in 1996 was the youngest to date. Adam Eaton batted in a run in the top of the fifth inning, followed two batters later by a Soto two-run double, giving the Nationals a 5–2 lead.

Scherzer exited after pitching five innings, having allowed two runs on five hits while striking out seven batters. Cole went seven innings, allowing five runs on eight hits while striking out six. After Nationals pitcher Patrick Corbin pitched a scoreless sixth, George Springer led off the bottom of the seventh inning with the 14th postseason home run of his career, off Nats relief pitcher Tanner Rainey. He also broke a World Series record held by Reggie Jackson and Lou Gehrig, with a home run in five consecutive World Series games, dating back to Game4 of the 2017 World Series. The Astros loaded the bases later in the inning with two walks off Rainey and an infield single off Daniel Hudson, but Hudson struck out Yordan Álvarez to prevent any more scoring. In the bottom of the eighth inning, pinch hitter Kyle Tucker singled, advanced to second on a fly ball by Aledmys Díaz, and Springer batted in another run with a double, pulling the Astros to within one run, 5–4. Sean Doolittle, the Nationals' fifth pitcher of the game, got the final out of the eighth inning and retired the side in order in the bottom of the ninth, concluding matters when Carlos Correa lined out to Víctor Robles to preserve the win. Doolittle earned his second save of the postseason and the underdogs took the series lead, marking the first time in franchise history that the Nationals won a World Series game.

Game 2

Gymnast and Houston native Simone Biles threw out the ceremonial first pitch of Game2. The starting pitchers were Stephen Strasburg for the Nationals and Justin Verlander for the Astros. After a walk and a single to start the game, Anthony Rendon batted in two runs with a double. Alex Bregman tied the game with a two-run home run in the bottom of the first. In the top of the second inning, Verlander recorded the 200th postseason strikeout of his career, surpassing John Smoltz (whose career spanned 1988–2009) and setting a new MLB record.

Leading off the top of the seventh, Kurt Suzuki hit a home run to put the Nationals ahead, 3–2. Verlander exited one batter later; he was charged with four runs on seven hits while striking out six batters, and was later assessed the loss. Washington scored five more runs in the seventh off Ryan Pressly, extending their lead to 8–2. With a six-run lead, Strasburg was removed before the bottom of the seventh, having held the Astros to two runs on seven hits while striking out seven. In the eighth inning, a two-run home run by Adam Eaton plus a run batted in (RBI) by Asdrúbal Cabrera extended the Nationals' lead to nine runs. A ninth-inning home run by Michael A. Taylor off Chris Devenski pushed the lead to 12–2. Astro Martín Maldonado hit a home run in the bottom of the ninth off relief pitcher Javy Guerra, but there was no further scoring as the Nationals completed their eighth consecutive playoff win.

Game 3

This was the first World Series game played in Washington D.C. since October 7, 1933, which was the clinching Game5 of the New York Giants' win over the Washington Senators. Chad Cordero of the 2005 Nationals threw out the ceremonial first pitch to former teammate Brian Schneider; former astronaut Buzz Aldrin also threw a ceremonial pitch. Aníbal Sánchez started for the Nationals, while Zack Greinke started for the Astros. In the second inning, Josh Reddick batted in Carlos Correa as Houston scored the game's first run. In the third inning, José Altuve doubled and advanced to third on an error, then scored on an infield single by Michael Brantley, giving the Astros a 2–0 lead. The Nationals loaded the bases with two outs in the bottom of the third, but were unable to score. In the bottom of the fourth, Ryan Zimmerman walked then was driven in by a triple by Víctor Robles, cutting the Astros' lead to 2–1.

Houston restored their two-run lead in the top of the fifth, as Altuve doubled and was then batted in by Brantley. Greinke left with two outs in the bottom of the fifth, having allowed one run on seven hits while striking out six batters. The Astros extended their lead to 4–1 in the top of the sixth, as Robinson Chirinos hit a home run off the left field foul pole netting. Sánchez lasted until one out in the top of the sixth, having allowed four runs on 10 hits while striking out four. With no additional scoring through the middle of the ninth, the Astros brought in closer Roberto Osuna to pitch the bottom of the ninth. Osuna allowed a one-out single to Adam Eaton, but otherwise retired the Nationals; Juan Soto struck out looking to end the Nationals’ eight-game playoff winning streak. Osuna earned his second save this postseason, as Houston narrowed Washington's lead in the series to 2–1. This became the first World Series to begin with three games won by the road team since 1996, when the first five games were won by the road team.

Game 4

The ceremonial first pitch was thrown out by a Nationals Youth Baseball Academy scholar-athlete. Patrick Corbin started for the Nationals and José Urquidy started for the Astros. The Astros scored early, recording two runs in the first inning on four consecutive singles with one out. Robinson Chirinos hit a two-run home run in the fourth inning, extending Houston's lead to 4–0. Urquidy exited after five innings, having held the Nationals scoreless, retiring nine straight batters before being removed.

Washington scored a run in the bottom of the sixth, coming on a Juan Soto ground out with the bases loaded and one out. Corbin pitched six innings, allowing four runs on seven hits while striking out five. A grand slam by Alex Bregman in the seventh inning extended Houston's lead to 8–1. It was the 20th ever World Series grand slam and first since Addison Russell hit one in Game6 of the 2016 World Series. With no further scoring, the Astros evened the series, 2–2, ensuring a sixth game in Houston. This was the fifth time a World Series started with the road team winning the first four games, the most recent occurrence having been 1996.

Game 5

The ceremonial first pitch was thrown out by chef José Andrés. The starting pitchers were Gerrit Cole for Houston and Joe Ross for Washington. Max Scherzer was scheduled to start for Washington, but was scratched about three hours before the game due to neck spasms.

A two-run home run by Yordan Álvarez in the top of the second inning gave the Astros an early lead. In the top of the fourth, Carlos Correa hit another two-run home run, extending Houston's lead to 4–0. Ross pitched for five innings, allowing four runs on five hits while striking out one batter. Juan Soto narrowed the lead to 4–1 with a home run in the bottom of the seventh. Yuli Gurriel batted in a run in the top of the eighth to restore the four-run lead. Cole left after seven innings, having held the Nationals to one run on three hits while striking out nine. George Springer's two-run home run in the top of the ninth stretched Houston's lead to 7–1. With Ryan Pressly ending the game by allowing no baserunners in the bottom of the ninth, the Astros moved to within a victory of their second title in three years.

Home plate umpire Lance Barksdale's strike zone during the game drew attention, with some sports journalists, including Jeff Passan, increasing their appeals to MLB for a computerized strike zone. Two women in the crowd flashed their bare chests during the game—briefly visible on television—in an attempt to raise awareness for their website, claiming proceeds from the site "will be going to women with breast cancer". Along with a third woman, they were removed from the game and were banned from all MLB stadiums "indefinitely". U.S. President Donald Trump was booed and "chants of 'Lock him up!' broke out in some sections" when he and wife Melania were introduced after the third inning during the regular serviceperson recognition segment. This led to some discussion in the media of the civility required of the event and the larger political discourse taking place. This was not the first time at a World Series that a President was booed; at the 1931 World Series, taking place during Prohibition, fans in Philadelphia had chanted at Herbert Hoover, "We Want Beer! We want Beer!"

Game 6

The ceremonial first pitch was thrown by Hakeem Olajuwon to Clyde Drexler, both of whom played college basketball for the Houston Cougars and later won the 1995 NBA Finals with the Houston Rockets. Starting pitchers were Justin Verlander for Houston and Stephen Strasburg for Washington, the same as in Game2.

Anthony Rendon batted in a run in the top of the first, giving the Nationals an early 1–0 lead. A sacrifice fly by José Altuve and a home run by Alex Bregman in the bottom of the first gave Houston a 2–1 lead. Bregman carried his bat to first base after homering, which some media members considered disrespectful. Fifth-inning home runs by Adam Eaton and Juan Soto gave the Nationals a 3–2 lead. Soto also carried his bat to first base after homering, mimicking Bregman. Post-game, both managers voiced displeasure with the bat-carrying; Bregman apologized and said he was at fault.

Verlander exited after five innings, having allowed three runs on five hits while striking out three batters. In the top of the seventh inning, Trea Turner was controversially called out for interference on a play at first base, which Washington manager Dave Martinez furiously took issue with, leading to his ejection. Later that inning, a two-out, two-run home run by Rendon off Will Harris—who had not allowed an earned run in the postseason—increased Washington's lead to 5–2. Rendon batted in two more runs in the top of the ninth with a double off Chris Devenski, extending the Nationals' lead to 7–2. Strasburg left with one out in the bottom of the ninth, having held the Astros to two runs on five hits while striking out seven. Sean Doolittle relieved Strasburg, and allowed a two-out double to Carlos Correa, but nothing further, and the Nationals evened the series to force a deciding seventh game. This was the first instance in MLB, NBA, or NHL history where the road team won the first six games of a best-of-seven series.

Interference call and Martinez ejection

In the top of the seventh inning, the Nationals had a 3–2 lead with a runner, Yan Gomes, on first base with no outs when batter Trea Turner hit a swinging bunt to the third base side of the pitcher's mound. Astros pitcher Brad Peacock fielded the ball and threw it to first base; the ball was not caught by first baseman Yuli Gurriel and rolled into foul territory beyond the base, apparently giving the Nationals runners on second and third with no outs. However, Turner was called out by home plate umpire Sam Holbrook for interference, negating the play and requiring Gomes to return to first base. While initial reports and television commentary indicated the call was for running outside the  runner's lane, MLB's chief baseball officer, Joe Torre, clarified after the game that Turner had interfered with Gurriel's attempt to catch the ball, stating that Turner "did run to the fair side of the 45-foot line, but really the violation was when he kept Gurriel from being able to catch the ball at first base." The call led to a delay of nearly  minutes while umpires confirmed their interpretation of the rules (the decision itself was a judgment call not reviewable via MLB instant replay). The call was argued by Nationals manager Dave Martinez when it was first made and again, more intensely, during the seventh-inning stretch, resulting in his ejection by Holbrook. It was the first ejection in a World Series since , when Atlanta Braves manager Bobby Cox had been ejected.

Game 7

This was the 40th time a World Series reached its deciding Game 7. The starting pitchers were Washington's Max Scherzer, who won Game1, and Houston's Zack Greinke, who received a no decision in Game3, making this the first World Series Game7 started by two previous Cy Young Award winners. Ceremonial first pitches were thrown by former Astros Jeff Bagwell and Craig Biggio.

A home run by Yuli Gurriel in the bottom of the second inning gave the Astros an early 1–0 lead. Carlos Correa hit a two-out RBI single in the bottom of the fifth inning to extend the lead to 2–0. Scherzer pitched five innings, allowing two runs on seven hits while striking out three batters. Greinke had given up only one hit (a single) before Anthony Rendon's home run in the top of the seventh cut the Astros' lead to 2–1. Greinke walked Soto after Rendon's homer and was then replaced by Will Harris. Harris gave up a two-run home run to Howie Kendrick off the right field foul pole, giving the Nationals a 3–2 lead, which they never relinquished. Greinke was charged with two runs on two hits while striking out three in  innings. Roberto Osuna pitched the eighth inning for Houston, when Juan Soto batted in Adam Eaton with two outs to give Washington a two-run lead. The Nationals extended their lead to 6–2 in the ninth inning, with two runs scoring on a one-out single by Eaton with the bases loaded.

The Nationals' win marked the sixth straight year that a team clinched the World Series title via a win on the road, including four times that a Game7 was won by the visiting team. For the first time in major North American sports history, the visiting team won all seven games of a best-of-seven postseason series. In championship series of the NBA, NHL, and MLB contested during 2019, road teams compiled an overall 17–3 record. Additionally, the Nationals became the first team to win the World Series in their first appearance since 2002, when the Anaheim Angels accomplished the feat by defeating the San Francisco Giants in seven games. During postgame ceremonies, Washington's Stephen Strasburg was presented with the World Series Most Valuable Player Award, the first time a former No. 1 overall draft pick earned the award, and the first time a pitcher had won the award since Madison Bumgarner had won in 2014.

Series statistics
2019 World Series (4–3): Washington Nationals (NL) defeated Houston Astros (AL).

The Nationals wore their alternate blue jerseys for all seven games.

Broadcasting

Television
The World Series was televised by Fox for the 20th straight year. Joe Buck called the games as play-by-play announcer along with John Smoltz as color commentator and Ken Rosenthal and Tom Verducci as field reporters. Kevin Burkhardt hosted the network's pregame shows, joined by analysts Frank Thomas, Alex Rodriguez and David Ortiz. Fox Deportes aired the series in Spanish, with Rolando Nichols calling the play-by-play, Edgar Gonzalez as color commentator, and Carlos Álvarez as field reporter.

MLB International fed the series to broadcasters outside the United States, with Matt Vasgersian providing play-by-play and Buck Martinez as color commentator.

Ratings

Game1 had the second-lowest audience for any Game1 to date, with only the 2014 World Series having a smaller audience for the opener. Game2 had the lowest audience for any Game2 to date, a distinction previously held by the 2012 World Series. Game4 was the lowest rated World Series game ever, and had the second-smallest audience ever, with only Game3 of the 2008 World Series having a smaller audience. Game7 was the least-watched Game7 ever, falling below the seventh game of 2014. Overall, this World Series had the fourth-lowest average number of viewers, with only 2014, 2012, and 2008 being lower. Ratings spiked considerably for Game 7, and there were strong ratings in the Houston (42.7/63) and Washington, D.C. (31.8/53) markets, making it the most-viewed MLB game in Washington since 1998.

Radio

ESPN Radio broadcast the World Series for the 22nd straight year, with coverage presented by AutoZone. Dan Shulman served as play-by-play announcer, with Chris Singleton as color commentator and Buster Olney as field reporter. Marc Kestecher and Kevin Winter hosted the pregame shows with reporter Tim Kurkjian. New Spanish-language radio network Unanimo Deportes, flagshipped at WMYM Miami, broadcast its first World Series with Beto Ferreiro and Orlando Hernández announcing.

Locally, both teams' flagship radio stations broadcast the series with their regular announcers. In Houston, KBME aired the series with Robert Ford and Steve Sparks announcing. In Washington, WJFK-FM aired the series with Charlie Slowes and Dave Jageler calling the games. Per MLB rules, the teams' other radio affiliates may carry the series but must air the ESPN Radio broadcast.

Aftermath

Astros
Speculation about sign stealing by the Astros had been rampant for a number of years. After being knocked out by the Nationals in the National League Division Series, several Dodgers (the team the Astros beat in the 2017 World Series) reached out to Washington Nationals second baseman Brian Dozier, who had been with Los Angeles the previous year, to warn him that Houston was elaborately stealing signs. Many American League clubs also reached out to Washington to say the same as well.

Shortly after the 2019 World Series concluded, on November 12, 2019, journalists Ken Rosenthal and Evan Drellich published a story in The Athletic detailing for the first time specific allegations that the Astros had engaged in illicit electronic sign stealing. MLB launched an investigation and found evidence that the Astros did engage in illegal electronic sign stealing in 2017 and 2018, but found no evidence they used the scheme in 2019.

After losing the 2019 World Series, the Astros have continued to be a top team, coming within one win of making the World Series in the shortened 2020 season and returning to the World Series in 2021 and 2022, which they lost to the Atlanta Braves and won over the Philadelphia Phillies, respectively.

Nationals
The Nationals, however, quickly lost many players from their championship team and fell to the bottom of the league. The Nationals let all-star third baseman Anthony Rendon leave in free agency to the Los Angeles Angels in the offseason (the Angels also signed 2019 Nationals part-time catcher Kurt Suzuki). Due to the COVID-19 pandemic, the Nationals were not able to properly celebrate their 2019 championship the following season, as spectators were not allowed in the stands during the shortened season. They raised their championship banner in front of an empty Nationals Park on the first day of the 2020 season, and received their championship rings in the clubhouse rather than on the field in front of the fans. The Nationals finished tied for last in the NL East in 2020. Postseason hero Howie Kendrick retired at the end of the season. Struggling at the trade deadline in 2021, the Nationals engaged in a large-scale selloff of top players who had led them to the championship. The Nationals became the first team to trade three players who were All-Stars before the end of the season, which included starting pitcher Max Scherzer, outfielder Kyle Schwarber, and shortstop Trea Turner. They also traded off important pieces from their World Series team, such as catcher Yan Gomes and reliever Daniel Hudson. By the end of 2021, only a handful of players from the 2019 championship team were still with the club.

The Nationals rotation that many saw as the team's strength during their World Series run was not as effective going forward. Scherzer, although still dominant, struggled with lower body injuries until he was traded to the Los Angeles Dodgers at the 2021 trade deadline. Patrick Corbin led the National League is losses and earned runs given up in 2021 and 2022. Anibal Sanchez struggled mighty during the 2020 season so much that he spent the 2021 season out of baseball entirely, only to return to Washington in 2022. Lastly, Stephen Strasburg, Washington's MVP of the 2019 World Series, was rewarded with a lucrative seven-year contract with the Nationals after the World Series. Unfortunately, Strasburg's body would break down rapidly due to injuries, only making a combined eight starts from 2020-2022.

By 2022, the Lerner family were exploring a sale of the Nationals. Later that year at the trade deadline, the team traded superstar Juan Soto,  after he rejected a reported 14-year extension, to San Diego for young players and prospects.

See also 

 2019 Japan Series
 2019 Korean Series

Notes

References

Further reading

External links 

World Series
World Series
World Series
Houston Astros postseason
Washington Nationals postseason
World Series
World Series
World Series
Baseball competitions in Washington, D.C.
Baseball competitions in Houston